Abacetus bembidioides is a species of ground beetle in the subfamily Pterostichinae. It was described by Stefano Ludovico Straneo in 1949.

References

bembidioides
Beetles described in 1949